|}

The Prix Yacowlef is a Listed flat horse race in France open to two-year-old thoroughbreds. It is run at Chantilly Racecourse over a distance of 1,000 metres (about 5 furlongs), and it is scheduled to take place each year in November.

The event was originally run at Deauville Racecourse and restricted to previously unraced horses. For a period its distance was 1,000 metres, and it was extended to 1,200 metres in 1987.

The Prix Yacowlef was formerly held in early August. It was switched to July and reverted to 1,000 metres in 2005. From 2016 the race moved to its current date and venue.

Records since 1978
Leading jockey (7 wins):
 Freddy Head – Princesse Lida (1979), Siagne (1982), Breath Taking (1984), Common Grounds (1987), Machiavellian (1989), Wixon (1992), Pas de Reponse (1996)

Leading trainer (9 wins):
 Criquette Head-Maarek – Siagne (1982), Breath Taking (1984), Goldneyev (1988), Pas de Reponse (1996), Mall Queen (1999), Wooden Doll (2000), Loving Pride (2002), Roseanna (2003), Speciale (2004)

Leading owner (3 wins):
 Stavros Niarchos – Captain's Gold (1983), Common Grounds (1987), Machiavellian (1989)
 Maktoum Al Maktoum – Royal Arrow (1998), Mall Queen (1999), Loving Pride (2002)

Winners since 1978

Earlier winners

 1885: Sycomore
 1891: Fontenoy
 1892: Senegal
 1895: Arreau
 1896: Indian Chief
 1897: Le Roi Soleil
 1898: Niphon
 1899: Delvino
 1900: Kadikoi
 1901: Impromptu
 1903: Gouvernant
 1904: Jardy
 1906: Madge
 1907: Pernambouc
 1909: Uriel
 1911: La Semillante
 1912: Banshee
 1913: Sardanapale
 1919: Jane Eyre
 1920: Xanthis
 1921: Despard
 1922: Épinard
 1923: Shahabbas
 1924: Ptolemy
 1925: Saint Fortunat
 1926: Little Muff
 1927: Miel Rosa
 1928: Mirabilis
 1929: Energie
 1930: Quatre Bras
 1931: Darya Awurd
 1932: On Parade
 1933: Laque d'Or
 1934: The Nile
 1935: Fragrance
 1936: En Fraude
 1937: La Sultane
 1938: Lactone
 1939: Balthazar
 1941: Nosca
 1944: Roi d'Atout
 1946: Le Lavandou
 1947: Djeddah
 1953: Sena
 1954: Chingacgook
 1955: Apollonia
 1956: Mourne
 1961: Prudent
 1962: Hula Dancer
 1963: Homely
 1968: Gris Vitesse
 1969: Chatter Box
 1970: Take a Chance
 1971: Riverman
 1972: Dahlia
 1973: Nonoalco
 1975: Manado
 1976: Assez Cuite

See also
 List of French flat horse races

References
 France Galop / Racing Post:
 

 pedigreequery.com – Prix Yacowlef – Deauville.

Flat horse races for two-year-olds
Deauville-La Touques Racecourse
Horse races in France